A stream is a body of moving water.

Stream or streaming may also refer to:

Arts, entertainment, and media

Films
 Stream, a 2008 film featuring Whoopi Goldberg
 Stream (film), an upcoming American horror film
 The Stream (film), a 1922 German silent film

Music
 Stream (album), a 1995 album by Fischer-Z
 Streaming (album), a 2006 album by Muhal Richard Abrams, George Lewis and Roscoe Mitchell
 Streams (1999 album), an album of Christian music by various artists
 Streams (Sam Rivers album), 1973
 Streams (Yuma Uesaka and Marilyn Crispell album), 2021
 "Stream", a 1997 song by Forest for the Trees from Forest for the Trees
 Streams, a 2007 album by Ferenc Snétberger and Markus Stockhausen
 "Stream", a 2015 song by Last Dinosaurs from Wellness
 "Stream", a 1992 song by Moby from Moby
 "Stream", a 1997 song by The Third and the Mortal from In This Room

Television
 Stream TV, an Italian television company
 The Stream (TV series), a Norwegian reality singing competition
 The Stream (news programme), a daily television programme on Al Jazeera English

Brands and enterprises
 Honda Stream, a car
 Microsoft Stream, a corporate video-sharing service
 Stream Energy, an American home services company
 Stream Global Services, an outsourcing company
 Stream unconference, a participant-driven technology meekon to bgamting

Computing and technology
 Data stream, a sequence of signals in connection-oriented communication
 Stream (computing), a sequence of data elements made available over time
 Stream (computer science), an analog of a list in type theory and functional programming
 Streamlet (scientific visualization), a graphical representation of flows
 Standard streams, preconnected input and output streams for computer programs
 Stream processing, a computer programming paradigm
 Streaming media, multimedia streamed to an end-user
 .stream, a generic top-level domain intended for streaming media sites
 Live streaming, media broadcast in real-time to the viewer
 Streaming services, list of subscription-based streaming platforms
 STREAM, a memory bandwidth measurement convention, and a benchmark
 STREAMS, a Unix System V framework

Other uses
 Streaming (education), grouping students by academic ability
 Flight Design Stream, a German paraglider design
 Precious metals streaming, a business model

See also
 
 
 Stream of consciousness (narrative mode)
 Streamer (disambiguation)
 Stream of particles